These are the official results of the Women's 400m Hurdles at the 1996 Summer Olympics in Atlanta, Georgia. There were a total of 30 competitors.

Results

Heats
Qualification: First 3 in each heat (Q) and the next 4 fastest (q) qualified to the semifinals.

Semifinals
Qualification: First 4 in each heat (Q) qualified directly to the final.

Final

See also
Men's 400m hurdles
Women's 100m hurdles

References

External links
 Official Report
 Results

H
400 metres hurdles at the Olympics
1996 in women's athletics
Women's events at the 1996 Summer Olympics